The State of Xíng (Xingguo) was a vassal state of ancient China during the Zhou Dynasty (1046–221 BCE) and Spring and Autumn period (770–475 BCE), ruled by descendants of the Jī family (姬). Its original location was on the plain east of the Shanxi plateau and north of most of the other states.

History
Sometime between 1046 and 1043 BCE, King Wu of Zhou granted lands around modern day Xingtai City,  to Pengshu of Xing (邢朋叔), who was the fourth son of the Duke of Zhou. In 662 BCE Duke Huan of Qi forced the people of Xing south east into Hebei Province to a place known as Yiyi (夷仪) (modern day Liaocheng City, Shandong about 90 miles east south-east of Xingtai). In 635 BCE, during the rule of Duke Yuan of Xing, the State of Xing was wiped out by the State of Wey.

References
 

Zhou dynasty

zh:西虢国